The nsess (Stomatepia mariae) is a species of cichlid endemic to Lake Barombi Mbo in western Cameroon. It can also be found in the aquarium trade. It is critically endangered because of pollution and sedimentation due to human activities. It is potentially also threatened by large emissions of carbon dioxide (CO2) from the lake's bottom (compare Lake Nyos), although studies indicate that Barombo Mbo lacks excess amounts of this gas.

References

External links 
 Photograph

Stomatepia
Cichlid fish of Africa
Freshwater fish of Cameroon
Endemic fauna of Cameroon
Fish of Lake Barombi Mbo
Fish described in 1930
Taxonomy articles created by Polbot